Jackson Health System in Miami, Florida is a nonprofit academic medical system in Miami, Florida. Governed by the Public Health Trust, a team of citizen volunteers acting on behalf of the Miami-Dade Board of County Commissioners, Jackson Health System offers Miami-Dade County residents health services based on financial need.

Jackson Health System consists of its centerpiece, Jackson Memorial Hospital; Jackson South Medical Center, Jackson North Medical Center, Holtz Children’s Hospital, Jackson Rehabilitation Hospital, Jackson Behavioral Health Hospital, a network of UHealth Jackson Urgent Care centers, multiple primary care, and specialty care centers; two long-term care nursing facilities; and a team of Corrections Health Services clinics. A new Jackson West Medical Center campus is under development in Doral, Florida.

Jackson Memorial Hospital

Jackson Memorial Hospital opened in 1918 as a 13-bed community hospital and has grown into an accredited, tax-assisted, tertiary teaching hospital associated with the Leonard M. Miller School of Medicine at the University of Miami.

Jackson Memorial Hospital's Miami Transplant Institute is one of the largest transplant centers in the United States. It is one of the only hospitals in Florida to perform every kind of organ transplant for both adult and pediatric patients.

It is also  home to Ryder Trauma Center, one of the only adult, and pediatric Level 1 trauma centers in Miami-Dade County, and a designated U.S. Army Forward Surgical Team Training Facility, where the military healthcare personnel prepares to treat soldiers injured on the battlefield.

Jackson Memorial Hospital operates a graduate program in which it works in conjunction with the University of Miami Miller School of Medicine faculty, offering patient care, educational programs, research-focused clinical settings, and community services that focus on health-related issues. Jackson North Medical Center maintains an affiliation with the Herbert Wertheim College of Medicine at Florida International University.

Holtz Children's Hospital
Among Jackson's Holtz Children's Hospital specialties is neonatology.

Governance
Jackson Health System is governed by the Public Health Trust Financial Recovery Board, a group of volunteers that act on behalf of the Miami-Dade Board of County Commissioners. Jackson Health System's current president and chief executive officer is Carlos A. Migoya.

History
The Public Health Trust of Miami-Dade County was created by county ordinance effective 1 October 1973 to provide for an independent governing body (the board of trustees or Board) responsible for the operation, governance, and maintenance of designated facilities.

References

External links
Official website

Health care companies based in Florida
Companies based in Miami
University of Miami
Government of Miami-Dade County, Florida
Municipal hospitals